Take a Letter is a game show aired on ITV from 10 January 1962 to 24 June 1964 and is hosted by Bob Holness (then billed as Robert).

External links

1960s British game shows
1962 British television series debuts
1964 British television series endings
ITV game shows
Television series by ITV Studios